The Federal FireStick is a proprietary polymer-hulled blank cartridge, introduced in 2020 for the Traditions NitroFire rifle. Containing 100 to 120 grains of Hodgdon 888 black-powder substitute and neither a primer nor a bullet, the round and the rifle designed for it were devised as a way of creating a gun that functions as closely to a modern rifle as possible whilst still being legal in muzzleloader hunting season.

Being supplied with neither a primer nor a projectile, the Federal FireStick blank round can be used as a live-fire cartridge by first inserting a primer manually into the rimmed base, then placing it into the breech of the Traditions NitroFire, much like a traditional shotshell in a break-action shotgun. Finally, a .50 calibre bullet is pushed down the barrel from the front using a ramrod, coming to rest at a narrowed neck that separates the slug from the charge and prevents the user from attempting to fire incompatible ammunition.

References

Rimmed cartridges
Blank cartridges